Stenoma ascodes is a moth of the family Depressariidae. It is found in Guyana.

The wingspan is 17–18 mm. The forewings are fuscous purple with the costal edge deep ferruginous from near the base, more broadly posteriorly, in females with indications of three somewhat darker irregular very oblique lines running from the anterior half of the costa. The hindwings are dark grey, in males clothed with hairscales in the disc and with the apical edge orange.

References

Moths described in 1915
Taxa named by Edward Meyrick
Stenoma